The Carrera family of Chile became politically influential during the colonial period, and played a significant role in the Chilean Independence. They remained politically important throughout the 19th century. Their descendants make up the bulk of the Chilean upper-class .

Genealogy 
 María Nicolasa de Valdés y de la Carrera (1733–1810), first First Lady of Chile
 Ignacio de la Carrera (1747–1819), member of Chile's first ruling junta in 1810.

The children of Ignacio de la Carrera are known in Chilean history as the Hermanos Carrera (Carrera siblings).  All except Javiera were military commanders in the fight against Spanish reconquest:
 Javiera Carrera (1771–1862), "Mother" of Chile, who sewed its first flag
 Brigadier Juan José Carrera (1782–1818), independentist hero
 General José Miguel Carrera (1785–1821), independentist leader, who governed Chile during its first period of independence, the Patria Vieja. 
 Colonel Luis Carrera (1791–1818), independentist hero

Other descendants also notable in their time:
 José Miguel Carrera Fontecilla (1821–1860), leader of the Chilean Civil War of 1851
 José Miguel Valdés Carrera (1837–1898), politician and several times minister
 Luis Aldunate Carrera (1842–1908) politician and several times minister
 Ignacio Carrera Pinto (1848–1882), soldier and hero of the Battle of La Concepcion during the War of the Pacific.
 Manuel Carrera Pinto (1854–1895) politician
 Federico Santa María Carrera (1845–1925) businessman and philanthropist
 María Elena Carrera Villavicencio (1929), politician

The Carrera name has disappeared by way of marriage from Chilean society, but their descendants, who number in the few hundred, are socially, politically and financially prominent.

See also
History of Chile
Manuel Rodríguez

References

Sources

 

Chilean families
Chilean families of Basque ancestry
Political families of Chile
+